Line 20 may refer to:

Line 20 (Shenzhen Metro), a metro line of the Shenzhen Metro

Metro Line

Under Planning
 Line 20 (Beijing Subway), a future metro line of the Beijing Subway
 Line 20 (São Paulo Metro), a future metro line of the São Paulo Metro
 Line 20 (Shanghai Metro), a future metro line of Shanghai Metro